"Can't Find the Time" is a song originally recorded by Orpheus in 1968.  It was the first release from their eponymous debut LP. The writer and lead singer is Bruce Arnold. Session drummer Bernard Purdie, who would later befriend Arnold and collaborate further, is among the musicians on the recording.

Originally released in early 1968, the song charted very minorly in the U.S., but reaching #15 on WMCA in New York City. The single was re-released in late 1969, with somewhat better success. It reached #80 on the U.S. Billboard Hot 100 and #72 Cash Box.  It was more popular in Canada, where it reached #63.

Rose Colored Glass cover
Dallas pop rock quartet Rose Colored Glass covered "Can't Find the Time" in 1971.  It was a non-album single.  Their version charted only in the U.S., but considerably higher than the prior releases, reaching #54.  The song also reached #30 on the U.S. Easy Listening chart.

Chart history
Orpheus original

Rose Colored Glass cover

Other cover versions
In 2000, Hootie & The Blowfish covered the song, entitled as "Can't Find the Time to Tell You." It was included on the soundtrack of the Farrelly brothers film Me, Myself & Irene starring Jim Carrey and Renée Zellweger.

References

External links
 
 
 

1968 songs
1968 singles
1969 singles
1971 singles
MGM Records singles
Bang Records singles
Hootie & the Blowfish songs
1960s ballads
American soft rock songs